Farsta Strand is a railway station on the Stockholm commuter rail's Nynäshamn line.  It is connected to the Farsta strand metro station, the southern terminus for line 18. The station was originally named "Södertörns villastad". It was renamed "Farsta strand" in 1989.

References

Railway stations in Stockholm
Railway stations opened in 1901
1901 establishments in Sweden